William Henry Beaglehole (6 May 1834 – 2 June 1917) was born at Helston, Cornwall, and came to South Australia on the Prince Regent with his mother, the widow Elizabeth Beaglehole (née Tresidder) and brother John, arriving in July 1849.

He started work as a builder, engaged on (among other projects) the earliest section of the Children's Hospital. When gold was discovered in Victoria he joined the rush and had some success at Castlemaine. He then operated as builder and developer, in partnership with Richard Hazelgrove (1828–1907), in the copper-mining towns of Kadina, Wallaroo and Moonta, then for eight years was landlord of Moonta's Royal Hotel.  He was the founder of Moonta's first Masonic lodge, and became a member of the town council.

Architect James Cumming designed for him a two-storey Italianate villa in fashionable Brougham Place, North Adelaide, which was completed in 1878.

He was a member for Wallaroo in the House of Assembly from April 1881 to April 1884, with (later Sir) R. D. Ross and Luke Furner as his colleagues. The district was divided, and he was elected to the new seat of Yorke Peninsula and served from April 1884 to March 1887 with colleague Robert Caldwell. He was one of those who pushed for the purchase of Belair National Park.

He founded the firm Beaglehole and Johnston with brothers James and Andrew Galbraith Johnston, owners of the Oakbank Brewery.

In 1884 he organised formation of the Lion Brewing and Malting Company and was elected chairman of directors.

He was a director of Broken Hill's Junction mine from 1894 to 1899.

He founded, with George Simpson, the Waverley Brewery at Broken Hill (it was later acquired by the South Australian Brewing Company). He started a distillery at Thebarton, which was subsequently acquired by Milne and Co. He was one of the first members of the South Australian Licensed Victuallers' Association. He was one of the founders of the Grand Hotel in Melbourne, with other South Australians Dr. Cawley, Mr. John Frew. Dr. Gorger, A. B. Murray, W. H. Simms and J. B. Spence.

He devoted much of his spare time cultivating a  farm and orchard at Virginia. He was the first on the Virginia plains to extract artesian water, with eight bores on his property, and was successful in fattening up lambs for market.

References 

Members of the South Australian House of Assembly
Settlers of South Australia
19th-century Australian businesspeople
20th-century Australian businesspeople
Australian brewers
1834 births
1917 deaths
British emigrants to Australia